Field hockey at the 2022 Asian Games in Hangzhou will be held at the Gongshu Canal Sports Park Field Hockey Field in the Gongshu District from 11 to 24 September 2022.

The winners will qualify for the 2024 Summer Olympics.

Qualification

Men's qualification

Women's qualification

References

 
2022
Asian Games
2022 Asian Games
2022 Asian Games events
Asian Games